John Trevelyan, CBE (11 July 1903 – 15 August 1986) was Secretary of the Board of the British Board of Film Censors from 1958 to 1971.

Early life and education
Trevelyan was born at Beckenham, Kent, England, the fourth child and elder son of the two sons and four daughters of Rev. George Philip Trevelyan (1858-1937), vicar of St Albans, later vicar of St Stephen's, Bournemouth, and Monica Evelyn Juliet (1872-1962), daughter of Rev. Sidney Phillips, of Worcester. Trevelyan's younger brother was Humphrey Trevelyan, Baron Trevelyan; his eldest sister was Mary Trevelyan, founder and governor of International Students House, London. They descended from the politician Sir John Trevelyan, 4th Baronet, who was of an ancient Cornish family.

He was educated at Lancing College in Sussex, and Trinity College, Cambridge (BA 1925, MA 1930).

Career
Having been involved in educational administration, in 1951 he joined the British Board of Film Censors as an examiner, and in 1958 became Secretary.

He brought a more liberal approach to the role of Chief Censor than his predecessors, claiming: "We are paid to have dirty minds". His Times obituary said that he "never shrank from using his scissors, especially when it came to protecting the young." He passed the 1969 Ken Russell film Women in Love (adapted from the D. H. Lawrence novel) with minor cuts, and received a complaint about the nude wrestling scene between the two male stars which claimed that the actors were "displaying their genials" (sic).

However, his approach was harshly criticised by some. According to film director Roy Ward Baker:

 
Trevelyan wrote a book on his experiences entitled What the Censor Saw, which was published in 1973.

Trevelyan was a critic of the early Bond films; when GoldenEye was released in 1995, the villain of the film was named Alec Trevelyan, allegedly in reference to John Trevelyan.

In an episode of the British comedy show Monty Python's Flying Circus, an animated sketch shows a hand removing a fig leaf from a representation of Michelangelo's David, only to reveal the cartoon face of Trevelyan, who informs the viewer: "We're not about to allow this sort of smut to be shown on screen."

Personal life
Trevelyan was married four times; firstly, in 1928, he married Kathleen Margaret, daughter of Charles Hallé Pass, of Barrow-in-Furness, Lancashire. Their only child, son Nicholas, was born and died 23 October 1932. They divorced in 1949. That same year he married Joan Frieda, daughter of Francis Clayton Scott and granddaughter of Sir James William Scott, 1st Baronet. They had a son and a daughter before divorcing in 1959. His third marriage, in 1959, was to Joan, daughter of Robert Mutch; they had two sons. In 1974, he married fourthly Rosalie Evelyn, daughter of Joseph Lopez-Salzedo.

He was appointed OBE in 1949, and CBE in 1971.

Trevelyan died in Croydon, Greater London, aged 83.

References 
Obituary Mr John Trevelyan, Film Censor with the diplomatic touch in The Times, London of 18 August 1986 page 12.

Bibliography 
Roy Ward Baker (2000) The Director's Cut. London: Reynolds and Hearn.

1903 births
1986 deaths
People from Beckenham
British arts administrators
British censors